Daniel Ferreira Pereira (born 12 April 1983), commonly known as Danielzinho, is a Brazilian former footballer.

Career statistics

Club

Notes

References

External links
 

1983 births
Living people
Brazilian footballers
Association football midfielders
Campeonato Brasileiro Série D players
Campeonato Brasileiro Série B players
Campeonato Brasileiro Série A players
Sociedade Esportiva Itapirense players
Clube Atlético Mineiro players
Marília Atlético Clube players
Boa Esporte Clube players
Paraná Clube players
Associação Ferroviária de Esportes players
Oeste Futebol Clube players
Grêmio Osasco Audax Esporte Clube players
Clube Atlético Linense players
Sampaio Corrêa Futebol Clube players